Gongnong Subdistrict is a subdistrict in Daoli District, Harbin, Heilongjiang province, China. , it has 14 residential communities under its administration.

See also 
 List of township-level divisions of Heilongjiang

References 

Township-level divisions of Heilongjiang
Harbin